Peter Joseph Phipps (born April 8, 1973) is a United States circuit judge of the United States Court of Appeals for the Third Circuit.

Biography 

Phipps earned both a Bachelor of Science in physics and a Bachelor of Arts in history from the University of Dayton, summa cum laude, and earned his Juris Doctor from Stanford Law School, where he served as the managing editor of the Stanford Law & Policy Review. He also served as a law clerk to Judge R. Guy Cole Jr. of the United States Court of Appeals for the Sixth Circuit.

Earlier in his career, Phipps spent three years as an associate at Jones Day, where his practice focused on civil litigation.

Before becoming a judge, Phipps served as senior trial counsel in the Federal Programs Branch of the United States Department of Justice Civil Division. During his 14-year tenure at the Justice Department, Phipps litigated some of the most significant cases implicating the interests of the United States and received numerous awards and commendations, including the Attorney General's Distinguished Service Award.

Federal judicial service

District Court service 

On February 12, 2018, President Donald Trump announced his intent to nominate Phipps to a seat on the United States District Court for the Western District of Pennsylvania. On February 15, 2018, his nomination was sent to the United States Senate. President Trump nominated Phipps to the seat vacated by Terrence F. McVerry, who assumed senior status on September 30, 2013. On April 25, 2018, a hearing on his nomination was held before the Senate Judiciary Committee. On May 24, 2018, his nomination was reported out of committee by a voice vote. On October 11, 2018, his nomination was confirmed by voice vote. He received his judicial commission on October 17, 2018, 
and was sworn in on October 23, 2018. His service as a district court judge ended on July 22, 2019 when he was elevated to the court of appeals.

Court of Appeals service
On May 3, 2019, President Trump announced his intent to nominate Phipps to serve as a United States Circuit Judge of the United States Court of Appeals for the Third Circuit. On May 13, 2019, his nomination was sent to the Senate. He has been nominated to the seat vacated by Thomas I. Vanaskie, who assumed senior status on November 30, 2018. On June 5, 2019, a hearing on his nomination was held before the Senate Judiciary Committee. On June 27, 2019, his nomination was reported out of committee by a 12–10 vote. On July 15, 2019, the Senate invoked cloture on his nomination by a 53–40 vote. and on the following day, July 16, his nomination was confirmed by a 56–40 vote. He received his judicial commission on July 17, 2019.

See also 
 Donald Trump Supreme Court candidates

References

External links 
 
 

|-

1973 births
Living people
20th-century American lawyers
21st-century American lawyers
21st-century American judges
Duquesne University faculty
Jones Day people
Judges of the United States District Court for the Western District of Pennsylvania
Judges of the United States Court of Appeals for the Third Circuit
Pennsylvania lawyers
People from Abilene, Texas
Stanford Law School alumni
United States Department of Justice lawyers
United States district court judges appointed by Donald Trump
United States court of appeals judges appointed by Donald Trump
University of Dayton alumni